Charles Harvey Combe (18 February 1863 – 14 August 1935) was a Conservative Member of Parliament from 1892 and 1897 for the English constituency of Chertsey.

Combe was raised at Cobham Park. He was educated at Eton. Afterwards he travelled for three years, visiting many countries of the world. He served for three years in the Sussex Militia.

Political career
In February 1892, Combe was selected by the Conservative Association for North-West Surrey to be candidate for the by-election to replace Frederick Alers Hankey, who had died that month. Combe won the by-election with 4,589 votes. The other candidate (L. J. Baker) received 2,751 votes. Combe was re-elected unopposed in the general elections of 1892 and 1895. He resigned two years later, because of his ill-health. Many years later, in 1929, Combe returned in the public eye when he was appointed as High Sheriff of Surrey.

Brewery
He was the director of the brewery firm Combe & Co. In 1898 the company merged with James Watney & Co. and Reid and Co., and was subsequently known as Watney Combe & Reid. The amalgamated company was the largest brewer in London. Combe died in August 1935 at the age of 72.

References

External links 

1863 births
1935 deaths
British businesspeople
People educated at Eton College
Conservative Party (UK) MPs for English constituencies
UK MPs 1886–1892
UK MPs 1892–1895
UK MPs 1895–1900